Sŏngp'yŏng station is a railway station in Kangal-li, Onsŏng County, North Hamgyŏng, North Korea; it is the endpoint of the Sŏngp'yŏng Line of the Korean State Railway.

History
The station was opened by the Tomun Railway Company on 1 December 1922, together with the rest of the Sŏngp'yŏng Line as well as the Sangsambong–Chongsŏng section of their mainline from Hoeryŏng to Tonggwanjin. On 1 April 1929 the Tomun Railway was nationalised and became the West Tomun Line of the Chosen Government Railway.

References

Railway stations in North Korea
Railway stations opened in 1922